The Radicalz (sometimes titled The Radicals) was a professional wrestling stable in  the World Wrestling Federation (WWF, now WWE) that debuted in 2000 during the Attitude Era. The members were former World Championship Wrestling (WCW) wrestlers Eddie Guerrero, Chris Benoit, Perry Saturn, and Dean Malenko. Terri later joined the group by proxy after becoming Saturn's on-screen girlfriend. Benoit, Malenko, and Saturn all had previously been a part of a similar small stable of younger talent while in WCW, The Revolution, which was dismantled by their defection.

The stable is notable for consisting of four well-known wrestlers that would jump ship during the Monday Night Wars. Within three months of joining the WWF, each member would hold a different championship at various points: Benoit with the WWF Intercontinental Championship, Guerrero with the WWF European Championship, Malenko with the WWF Light Heavyweight Championship, and Saturn with the WWF Hardcore Championship.

History

Origins 
Benoit, Malenko and Guerrero toured the world before signing with WCW. Their lack of size did not translate well in the United States, but their respective styles were popular in countries like Mexico, Canada and particularly Japan.The trio would face off repeatedly, forcing them to spend a lot of time together.

They caught the attention of  Philadelphia-based promotion Extreme Championship Wrestling's (ECW) booker and promoter Paul Heyman. Heyman was keen to introduce the Mexican lucha libre style to the United States professional wrestling fans, and he saw Guerrero as an ideal example of this. He also loved the technical styles of Benoit and Malenko, so Heyman booked all three men in his company. It would be here that they met Perry Saturn, a traditional power wrestler and brawler, but he did not become a member of the group until they all signed contracts with WCW.

World Championship Wrestling 

In 1999, many WCW mid-card to upper-level stars became unhappy with the political environment of WCW.Management offered anyone who was unhappy a chance to be released from their contracts. Scott Levy aka Raven was singled out for his comments on WCW by WCW President Eric Bischoff and offered an opportunity to negotiate his release with the WCW lawyers immediately if he was so unhappy, which Levy did. The contract forbid Levy from signing with the WWF for the length of terms of his original WCW contract. However, Levy did not see this as an issue and re-debuted in ECW less than a week later in August 1999. His attitude inspired other wrestlers who followed suit.

In early 2000, Benoit, Guerrero, Saturn and Malenko headed to the WWF.  At the time of the jump, Benoit, Malenko and Saturn were members of a stable in WCW called The Revolution, whose leader was "The Franchise" Shane Douglas, which further fueled the rumors that Douglas wanted in on the jump.

At the time of their departure to the WWF, Benoit was recognized as the WCW World Heavyweight Champion, having won the vacant title by defeating Sid Vicious at Souled Out. In reality, then WCW head booker Kevin Sullivan decided to give Benoit the title as an attempt to keep him in WCW. The two never saw eye-to-eye, however, a primary reason believed to have been Benoit becoming romantically involved in real-life with Sullivan's wife Nancy (Nancy and Sullivan were separated, but not yet divorced) – Benoit and Nancy later married. WCW management later stated on Nitro that Vicious' foot was under the ropes at the time Benoit forced the submission and therefore his title reign was deemed invalid. However, the WWF would recognize the title change.

World Wrestling Federation 

The four first made their appearance on the January 31, 2000 episode of Raw Is War as audience members and backstage guests of Mick Foley. They interfered in a match consisting of Al Snow and Steve Blackman and The New Age Outlaws. While the group was sitting in the front row, Road Dogg took a cheap shot at Benoit, which prompted all four to severely beat both of The New Age Outlaws inside and out of the ring. The attack ended after Guerrero performed a frog splash on Billy Gunn and Benoit performed a diving headbutt on Dogg, with Jim Ross dubbing them The Radicalz. The four were offered a chance to "win" contracts by beating the members of D-Generation X in a series of three matches. Malenko lost to X-Pac after an illegal groin attack, while Saturn and Guerrero ended up losing against The New Age Outlaws, since Dogg had pulled the referee out of the ring when Guerrero was covering Gunn for the pin after a frog splash, thereby illegally breaking up the cover. Benoit then lost to Triple H, but not before making him tap out to the Crippler Crossface while the referee was unconscious. Soon afterwards, the four wrestlers were "given" contracts with the WWF by Triple H, in exchange for them turning on Mick Foley. The group became known as The Radicalz (sometimes spelled The Radicals in on-screen graphics), and they attained some measure of success. At first tightly knit, all four of the wrestlers in the group eventually drifted apart as all of them sought stardom as singles wrestlers in the WWF.

Saturn and Malenko formed a tag team, with the injured Guerrero serving as a manager for the team. Benoit sought singles success and only worked with the stable when he required back up. Malenko quickly won the WWF Light Heavyweight Championship, annoying Benoit. Varying levels of success caused a rift within the group, and they quietly separated. However, Saturn turned on Guerrero, instigating a feud over the WWF European Championship.

The four drifted apart mainly in the summer of 2000 to pursue individual goals, but in November of that year the group reformed and aligned themselves with Triple H as his secondaries/hired guns during his feud with Stone Cold Steve Austin. In early 2001, Benoit had turned into a fan favorite during a rivalry with Kurt Angle, while the other Radicalz remained villains and eventually forced Benoit out of the group, with Guerrero replacing him as the leader.

Guerrero eventually turned into a fan favorite as well, and had a short alliance with Team Xtreme (The Hardy Boyz and Lita), but went to rehab in June 2001 for alcohol abuse. Guerrero completed a three-month program and had started working house shows to get ready for his return to television, but was released by the WWF in November 2001 after getting arrested for driving while intoxicated. Saturn, Terri and Malenko continued as The Radicalz until Malenko's retirement, making their final appearance together on the July 3, 2001 episode of SmackDown! where a frustrated Malenko attacked Saturn after his erratic behavior disrupted a bout between Malenko and Scotty 2 Hotty.

Aftermath
Guerrero was re-signed by the WWF in March 2002, and was paired with Benoit to coincide with his return from injury (though not as The Radicalz). The duo would separate after jumping to the SmackDown! brand, but interacted on occasion, either as opponents or allies. The most notable instance occurred at WrestleMania XX, where the two celebrated together after successfully reigning as world champions, as Guerrero retained the WWE Championship and Benoit won the World Heavyweight Championship. They would celebrate together for the final time at the first ECW One Night Stand event, after wrestling their final match against each other.

Guerrero died from acute heart failure due to arteriosclerotic cardiovascular disease on November 13, 2005, while Benoit committed suicide on June 24, 2007 after murdering his wife and son. Both Guerrero and Benoit were still employed by WWE at the time of their deaths. Malenko retired from in-ring competition in 2001, but remained with WWE as a road agent until departing the company in 2019 and joining All Elite Wrestling. Saturn was released by WWE in 2002 and, after a few years where his whereabouts were unknown, remained active on the independent circuit until his retirement in 2013. Terri left WWE in 2004 after eight years with the company and is no longer involved in the professional wrestling industry.

Championships and accomplishments 
 World Wrestling Federation
 WWF Hardcore Championship (2 times) – Perry Saturn
 WWF Light Heavyweight Championship  (2 times) – Dean Malenko
 WWF European Championship (3 times) – Eddie Guerrero (2) and Perry Saturn (1)
 WWF Intercontinental Championship (3 times) – Chris Benoit (2) and Eddie Guerrero (1)

See also 
 The Revolution (WCW)

References 

WWE teams and stables